Grainger Hines (born August 18, 1948) is an American actor, writer, producer, and director.

Career
He has appeared in numerous television shows - True Blood, Boston Legal, Nip/Tuck, CSI: Miami, Cold Case, Las Vegas, Matlock, Saving Grace, Ghost Whisperer, In the Heat of the Night, Blue Bloods, Airwolf, Star Trek: The Next Generation (uncredited), Hell on Wheels among others. He also has appeared in many films such as Lincoln, Protocol, Innerspace, Rocky II, False Identity, Abuse of Power, Thicker Than Water, Amber Waves, Summer School Teachers, and others.  Hines also appeared in the miniseries War and Remembrance and The Alamo: Thirteen Days to Glory. Hines also starred in the soap opera, One Life to Live as Brian Beckett from 1984 - 1986, General Hospital as Kyle Morgan from 1990 - 1991 and The City as Malcolm Christerphor from 1994 - 1995. Hines made his New York stage debut in Valentine's Day, directed by Horton Foote, and has appeared in many plays in New York and Los Angeles.  From 2014 to 2015, Hines portrayed Captain August Robertson in the Cinemax TV series The Knick.

He wrote, produced and starred in the western drama, The Outsider and directed the horror thriller, The Mill.

Hines was a member of musical group The Swingin' Medallions between 1968 and 1971.

Family
He was once the partner of Michelle Phillips, most notable as a singer in The Mamas & the Papas. Hines has three sons Aron Hines, and Austin Hines, and Gray Hines. Aron and Austin's mother is Michelle Phillips. Hines continues to write, produce, direct and act in television and films.

Partial filmography

Together for Days (1972) - Shelley's Dance Partner
Summer School Teachers (1974) - Bob
The Day of the Locust (1975) - French Lt.
Rocky II (1979) - Emergency Room Aide
Protocol (1984) - Jerry
Innerspace (1987) - Rusty
False Identity (1990) - Tommy
Soldier's Fortune (1991) - Link
Street Knight (1993) - Murphy
Discretion Assured (1994) - Austin
The Outsider (1994) - John Gower
Strong Island Boys (1997) - Coach
When (1999) - Austin
Just for the Time Being (2000) - Mike Fischer
Sally (2000) - Ben
A Terceira Morte de Joaquim Bolívar (2000) - Michael Phillips
Beacon Hill (2004) - Spanky Reardon
Ghost Whisperer (2008) - Detective Pete Richardson
The Mill (2008) - A Killer
Beneath the Dark (2010) - Tim
Lincoln (2012) - Gideon Welles
Slightly Single in L.A. (2013) - Detective Johnson
Bloodline (2013) - Ranger Ray
Martial Science (2013) - Dick Roberts
Hot Bath an' a Stiff Drink (2014) - Sheriff Roscoe Hardin
North Blvd (2014) - Sid
Hollywood (2015) - Dave
The Family Fang (2015) - Sheriff Hale
JOB's Daughter (2016) - Sheriff Conolly
C Street (2016) - Reverend Fink
Kensho at the Bedfellow (2017) - Frank
The Ballad of Buster Scruggs (2018) - Mr. Arthur
 Dr. Death (2021) - Earl Burke

References

External links
 

American male television actors
People from Greenwood, South Carolina
Living people
Male actors from South Carolina
American male film actors
21st-century American male actors
20th-century American male actors
1948 births